"My Kingdom" is the first single from Future Sound of London's 1996 release Dead Cities.  It is written in a theme and variation format on the song "My Kingdom", but Part 4 returns to the original theme.  Part 5 is the radio edit.

Track listing
 "My Kingdom: Part 1" (10:50) 
 "My Kingdom: Part 2" (03:15) (Leon Mar reconstruct)
 "My Kingdom: Part 3" (07:11) 
 "My Kingdom: Part 4" (05:12) 
 "My Kingdom: Part 5" (03:54)

Crew & Notes
 The guitar sample is by Ozric Tentacles, from the song "Phalarn Dawn" on their album, "Pungent Effulgent"
 The pan flute sample (performed by Gheorghe Zamfir), is from "Cockeye's Song" and "Childhood Memories", on the soundtrack to Once Upon a Time in America by Ennio Morricone, although it is only credited on the sleeve as being from "Once Upon a Time in America".
 The vocal sample is by Mary Hopkin, from "Rachel's Song", on the Blade Runner soundtrack by Vangelis
 "My Kingdom: Part 3" starts with the voice sample from "Everyone in the World is Doing Something Without Me" also from Dead Cities.
Engineer – Yage 
Producer – Future Sound of London, The 
Written By Dougans, Cobain

Chart Position

References

External links
 

1996 songs
The Future Sound of London songs
Astralwerks singles